Scottish Airways was an airline serving most of Scotland, especially the Highlands and Islands. It was active from 1937 until 1947, when it was merged into British European Airways.

History

Foundation
The company was established on 12 August 1937 by a group of investors including Whitehall Securities Corporation, LMS Railway and Western Isles Airways.

Whitehall Securities was a wealthy, powerful investment enterprise which had already set up British Airways Ltd which operated mainly in England. Whitehall was run by Clive Pearson, who was now performing a similar feat in Scotland.

LMS Railway wanted to invest in transport to the Scottish islands where rail couldn't reach. Railway Air Services (RAS) was the rail industry's response to the airlines with whom they were already competing (to the extent of banning other airlines' ticket sales through their agents). LMS was already a partner in RAS and saw Scottish Airways as an extension of their operation rather than competition.

Western Isles Airways (WIA) was an investment tool, 50% owned by David MacBrayne ferry company, and 50% owned by Whitehall Securities, It was set up because the Ministry of Transport required MacBraynes to keep separate accounts for its aviation interests. MacBrayne, which was 50% owned by LMS already, could see air travel as a complement to their existing operations.

Scottish Airways consisted of two airlines already owned by Whitehall: Highland Airways and Northern & Scottish Airways (N&SA). At the time of the formation of Scottish Airways, N&SA had a change of name, becoming Northern Airways. The precise details of ownership of Scottish Airways were Northern Airways 31.9%, Highland Airways 18.1%, LMS 40%, and WIA 10%. This effectively meant that Whitehall Securities held a 55% share of Scottish Airways, with LMS controlling 45%.

Highland Airways was run by its founder, Ted Fresson and was based in Inverness, specialising in services to the Northern Isles of Orkney and the Shetlands. Likewise, N&SA was run by its founder, George Nichols, but was based at Renfrew Airport, Glasgow, specialising in serving the Western Isles. At the start, each airline retained its own identity, their bosses remained in place, and their roles and responsibilities were little changed. The N&SA timetable for October 1937 shows the company name as "Northern and Scottish Airways (Northern Airways Limited)".

The coverage of Scotland was not complete, however, largely because of the intransigence of Eric Gandar Dower, the founder of what was now Allied Airways (Gandar Dower), based at the airport he founded and owned; Dyce at Aberdeen. He was operating routes to the Northern Isles in competition with Fresson. He refused to allow competing airlines access to his airport, and rejected any thoughts of co-operation with or investment by anyone else, a situation that endured until all private airlines were nationalised after World War II.

Pre-war operations
At first the operations of the two divisions went on much as before the takeover. Advantages which the new airline with its railway and ferry investors promoted were that tickets were now available from all British railway stations as well as the usual travel agents, and heavy luggage could be sent in advance by rail and ferry. Of particular note was “inter-availability”; tickets could be exchanged between air, rail or MacBrayne ferries (out by air, return first class by steamship and rail, or out by surface, return by air for a supplement).

On 3 May 1938 N&SA opened a new route, flown by chief pilot David Barclay in their new Dragon Rapide G-AFEY, from Renfrew Airport via Perth, Inverness and Kirkwall (Orkney) to Sumburgh (Shetland). Another intermediate stop, at Wick, was soon added.

In 1938 the Air Transport Licensing Authority (ATLA) had been established by the government to license scheduled airline services and civil airports, as part of the effort to improve the British aviation industry spurred by the Maybury Committee report of 1936. Other areas of activity were to improve navigation, air traffic control and radio aids, weather reporting, pilot training and certification, and airport facilities. In order to rationalise airline routes to provide good service without needless, wasteful and often damaging competition, many small airlines closed or merged, and larger, better financed operations thrived. Scottish Airways was performing valuable services for the Highlands and Islands, and its routes were largely unaffected, but one decision the ATLA took, in February 1939, was to stop their competition on routes to Aberdeen, leaving that city's routes to Eric Gandar Dower's Allied Airways.  As a condition of licence approval, airlines had to commit to providing their aircraft for government use in the event of national emergency.

Western Isles Airways was granted the ATLA licences for the routes from Glasgow to the Inner and Outer Hebrides, but those were actually operated by N&SA.

The first regular airmail service between Kirkwall and South Ronaldsay was performed by Ted Fresson of Highland Airways on 31 July 1939 in Dragon G-ACIT.

In the summer of 1939 Scottish Airways started an Orkney to London route taking just six hours. Leaving Kirkwall at 6:25am, the flight would connect with North Eastern Airways at Perth, flying in their Airspeed Envoys to Edinburgh, Newcastle and London (Croydon). The service only lasted a few months before war caused its cancellation.

Routes, 1938
From timetable dated May 1938

Glasgow — Campbeltown (Kintyre) — Islay (Glenegedale) (twice daily except Sunday)
Glasgow — Islay (Monday, Friday, Saturday)
Glasgow — Tiree (The Reef) (Monday, Wednesday, Friday)
Glasgow — Barra (Northbay) — South Uist (Askernish) — Benbecula (Balivanich) — Tiree — North Uist (Sollas) (daily except Sunday)
Glasgow — Perth — Inverness (Longman) — Wick (Hillhead) — Kirkwall (Wideford) — Lerwick (Sumburgh) (daily except Sunday)
Aberdeen (Kintore) — Inverness — Wick — Kirkwall — Lerwick (daily except Sunday)
Isle of Man (Derbyhaven/Ronaldsway) — Glasgow (operated by Isle of Man Air Services Ltd) (thrice daily)

Routes, 1939
ATLA licensed routes, February 1939

Kirkwall — Sanday — Stronsay — Westray — Longhope — North Ronaldsay
Kirkwall — Wick
Inverness — Wick — Thurso — Kirkwall
Kirkwall — Shetland
Thurso — Longhope — Kirkwall

World War II

On 29 August 1939, the ATLA was replaced by a new department of the Air Ministry, National Air Communications (NAC), based at Whitchurch. Almost all flyable civil aircraft were flown to gathering points, Scottish Airways' point being Renfrew. The NAC directed all civil operations as required, both to maintain essential services and to assist the army in carrying freight, especially blood supplies, particularly to France. Camouflage was applied to many NAC aircraft, and registrations were underlined with red, white and blue stripes, with RAF-style fin flashes and roundels on the wings. Many aircraft had their passenger windows "blacked-out" with white paint so that occupants couldn't see things outside that they shouldn't – carrying cameras was strictly forbidden. Priority on all flights was given to military personnel. On 27 March 1940, the RAF started to take over the direct operation of non-scheduled civil flying, starting the process of impressment.

NAC found that it was having to subsidise the airlines under its control, so it requisitioned the aircraft of those companies it didn't deem to be essential, effectively closing them down, although those with substantial engineering departments became Civilian Repair Units (CRU) organised by the Civilian Repair Organisation. Scottish Airways was selected as a CRU at Renfrew. The airlines that were left all had close associations with rail companies (with the notable exception of Gandar Dower's Allied Airways), whose influence was noted by Member of Parliament Robert Perkins, who also represented the Air Line Pilots Association.

NAC had access to the following Scottish Airways aircraft. See the Fleet list below for further details.
De Havilland Dragon: G-ACIT, G-ACNG, G-ADCT
De Havilland Dragon Rapide: G-ADAJ, G-AEWL, G-AFEY, G-AFOI, G-AFRK
Spartan Cruiser II: G-ACSM, G-ACYL, G-ACZM
Spartan Cruiser III: G-ADEL.

Scottish Airways was initially permitted to fly three routes: Renfrew — Rothesay — Cock-of-Arran — Campbeltown — Bowmore, Inverness — Lybster, and Wick — Kirkwall; the latter two could be modified at the wishes of RAF Coastal Command.

On 3 September 1939 inter-island services were suspended, resumed in November and finished again on 27 April 1940, and the island airfields were blocked by stone cairns. Stromness and Thurso airfields were taken over by the military and rendered permanently unusable.

In the Orkneys, Ted Fresson was left with one Rapide, G-ADAJ, for doing much-needed charter flights, but soon the need for a regular service was recognised, and Scottish Airways restarted an Inverness — Kirkwall — Sumburgh route. Longman Airfield at Inverness was available to Scottish Airways despite the fact that it had been requisitioned for military use. The airline stopped serving Wick in February 1941 because it was unsuitable, but it became available after RAF Coastal Command laid tarmac runways there. On 18 March 1940 Scottish Airways' Rapide G-AFEY crashed into a stone wall at Wideford (Kirkwall), and both Scottish Airways and Allied Airways were allowed to use RNAS Hatston, but it appears that at this stage they didn't. In late 1941 one of Allied's Rapides, G-ACZF, crashed, also hitting a stone wall at Wideford. This time they did move, first to RAF Skeabrae, much further from Kirkwall, and on 10 December 1941 to RAF Grimsetter, much closer to Kirkwall and the site of the present Kirkwall Airport.

With the surrender of France on 22 June 1940, once all their surviving aircraft had returned, on 27 June NAC was replaced by a new organisation, the Associated Airways Joint Committee (AAJC). Based at Liverpool's Speke Airport, it took control of most of the domestic private air companies. Scottish Airways joined it and its aircraft became part of the fleet. Some were impressed for use by the armed forces, and others were used to run the services that the AAJC deemed necessary. During and after the war the AAJC provided further aircraft, De Havilland Dominies, which were military versions of the Dragon Rapide, with improved engines.

Before the war, Ted Fresson had tried tirelessly to get an airfield built at Stornoway, the largest town in the Hebrides, on the island of Lewis and Harris. Finally he convinced the council, and the airfield was completed in August 1939 at Melbost, just outside the town, on a golf course where Fresson had landed several times on air ambulance missions. The outbreak of war had prevented its use, but the NAC granted permission, and the Southern Division of Scottish Airways extended its Hebrides route there in May 1940. Eventually, after RAF Coastal Command had laid runways there, the Northern Division was also given permission, and direct flights from Inverness started on 24 May 1944. This was a particularly difficult route, especially in winter, as it crossed the highlands, and gales, ice and low clouds were often encountered. An alternative route around the north-west tip of Scotland was possible, but was long and arduous, especially in high winds.

Along with Allied Airways, Scottish Airways was kept extremely busy during the war, with thousands of passengers carried, including civilians, Norwegian refugees, and military personnel, plus freight, mail and newspapers. Air ambulance and search operations for survivors from torpedoed ships were also undertaken. All of this was happening with the constant threat of encountering enemy aircraft.

To demonstrate the importance of their services, between 1940 and 1945 Scottish Airways and Allied Airways together flew 41% of all domestic airline passengers carried in Britain, and 64% of the mail and freight.

Routes, 1941
From timetable dated May 1941. "Facility of inter-availability of tickets with rail and/or steamer still applies."
 Inverness — Kirkwall (twice daily except Sunday)
 Inverness — Kirkwall — Shetland (daily except Sunday)
 Glasgow — Campbeltown — Islay (daily except Sunday)
 Glasgow — Tiree — Barra (by request, weather & tide permitting) — Benbecula — North Uist — Stornoway (daily except Sunday)
The timetable also offered routes via Liverpool and Glasgow to Belfast operated by Railway Air Services.

Routes, early 1945
Routes in early or mid 1945 (precise date not stated)

Northern Division
 Inverness — Kirkwall (twice daily except Sunday)
 Inverness — Kirkwall — Lerwick (daily except Sunday)
 Inverness — Stornoway (thrice weekly)

Southern Division
Operated on behalf of Western Isles Airways Ltd.
 Glasgow — Campbeltown — Islay (twice daily except Sunday)
 Glasgow — Tiree — Benbecula — North Uist — Stornoway (daily except Sunday)

Post-war operations
After the end of World War II, in the short term little change occurred. Some routes were opened up, still under the direction of the AAJC, but the government was now intent on nationalising all scheduled airlines in Britain. The AAJC was replaced by a new corporation to run domestic and European routes, British European Airways (BEA), while British Overseas Airways Corporation (BOAC) would serve the rest of the world apart from the Caribbean and South America, which would be the preserve of British South American Airways (BSAA). The chairman of BEA was Brigadier general Sir Harold Hartley, who was well versed in civil aviation; he had been involved with the aviation activities of LMS Railway, was chairman of RAS, and also chaired the AAJC before becoming a director of BOAC. His deputy was Air Commodore Whitney Straight who also had a great deal of experience in civil airlines and airports, having founded the Straight Corporation and developed Western Airways during the 1930s and had a distinguished military career during the war.

BEA's UK division started work at Liverpool Speke airport, the old home of the AAJC, on 1 August 1946, and the Continental Division was based at Northolt Aerodrome. Attention centred on the Continental division, and the UK Division was in no position to run its own operations yet, so it allowed the existing airlines to operate on its behalf, starting on 2 August, in the hope that BEA would take over in the following February. So it was that the airlines continued to operate with their own aircraft, routes and staff, at least in the short term, while awaiting their fate.

In 1945 Kirkwall's civil airport was again RAF Hatston, which, at Ted Fresson's advice, had been equipped with tarmac runways – the first in Britain. On 22 August 1946 Ted Fresson came to Hatston in Douglas DC-3 G-AGZA on loan from RAS which made some trial landings and gave a demonstration flight to some local people. Scottish Airways did employ DC-3 Dakotas in 1946 for a Prestwick — Northolt route under a contract for BEA, but sub-contracted operations to RAS.

Scottish Airways acquired two Junkers Ju 52 trimotors in 1946. They were from a batch of eleven bought by RAS after the war. They were painted in BEA livery as they were to be operated by RAS on contract to BEA. While they were rugged and comfortable (new specially designed seats had been fitted by Shorts during their conversion to civil use), they had been poorly built during the war and engine fumes would leak into the cockpit. Also, spares, particularly tyres and exhaust parts were difficult to source, and starting the engines required ground power units which were not available at most of the airfields used by the airline. They were not used much.

Routes, late 1945
From timetable dated 8 October 1945 There is no mention of ticket inter-availability.
Inverness — Kirkwall (twice daily except Sundays)
Inverness — Kirkwall — Shetland (daily except Sundays)
Inverness — Stornoway (Mondays, Wednesdays and Fridays)
Glasgow — Campbeltown (daily except Sundays)
Glasgow — Islay (daily except Sundays)
Glasgow — Tiree — Stornoway (Mondays, Wednesdays and Fridays, including Benbecula southbound only)
Glasgow — Stornoway (Mondays, Wednesdays and Fridays)
Glasgow — Tiree — Benbecula — Stornoway (Tuesdays, Thursdays and Saturdays)
Glasgow — London (Croydon) (daily except Sundays, in association with Railway Air Services)
Glasgow — Belfast (Nutts Corner) (daily except Sundays, in association with Railway Air Services)

Routes, 1946
Routes operated by Scottish Airways on behalf of BEA
Glasgow — Stornoway (daily except Sunday)
Glasgow — Tiree — Barra — Benbecula (daily except Sunday)
Glasgow — Campbeltown (daily except Sunday)
Glasgow — Campbeltown – Islay (daily except Sunday)
Glasgow — Belfast (thrice daily)
Glasgow — Orkney – Shetland (daily except Sunday)
Aberdeen — Inverness (four times a week)
Aberdeen — Inverness – Stornoway (three times a week)
Inverness — Wick — Orkney (twice daily)
Wick — Orkney (on demand)

Demise

On 1 February 1947 Scottish Airways was nationalised and became part of BEA. The two divisional managers still nominally retained their positions, but became increasingly marginalised. Fresson argued that BEA should set up a separate Scottish Division, and this was agreed, but he realised that it had been pointless when more of BEA's completely unsuitable Junkers Ju 52s were imposed as Rapide replacements. The Division was soon merged with the English division again, with Fresson appointed BEA's manager for the Highlands and Islands. (The Scottish Division was re-established in 1949).

On 11 February 1948 Fresson was flying a charter flight in Dragon G-ACIT, carrying three inspectors from the Ministry of Civil Aviation. At Westray he was contacted with an urgent request to transport a badly injured child from Stronsay to hospital in Kirkwall, which he promptly did. On hearing about this, Fresson's senior management gave him a severe reprimand for not seeking prior permission, and within a fortnight he was made redundant, leaving on 31 March. The only compensation he received for the nationalisation of his airline was the gift of the De Havilland Gipsy Moth G-AAWO, which he had brought to the organisation in the first place.

Fleet list
All aircraft operated by Scottish Airways 1937–1947.

It is likely that further Dominies were loaned from the military during the war without taking civil registrations. X7453, HG725 and NF881 in October 1944 have been reported.

Pre-war livery was probably overall silver with black lettering and trim. Post-war the lettering, trim and struts were painted cobalt blue.

Accidents and incidents
The following aircraft were involved in accidents or incidents while with Scottish Airways: Dragon: G-ACNG, G-ADCT. Rapide: G-AEWL, G-AFEY, G-AFFF, Dominie: G-AGDH, G-AGED, G-AGJG, Junkers: G-AHOK, Cruiser: G-ACYK. See Fleet list above for details.

See also
 List of defunct airlines of the United Kingdom

Footnotes

References

Bibliography

Defunct airlines of the United Kingdom
Airlines established in 1937
Airlines disestablished in 1947
British companies established in 1937
British companies disestablished in 1947
Aviation in Scotland
Defunct airlines of Scotland
1937 establishments in Scotland
1947 establishments in Scotland